Agios Theodoros is a village in Cyprus, on the Karpass Peninsula on the main road between Trikomo and Rizokarpaso. It is under the de facto control of Northern Cyprus.

References

Communities in Famagusta District
Populated places in İskele District